Luk Keng Wong Uk is a village situated in the Luk Keng area, in the northeastern part of the New Territories, Hong Kong.

Administration
Luk Keng Wong Uk is a recognized village under the New Territories Small House Policy. It is one of the villages represented within the Sha Tau Kok District Rural Committee. For electoral purposes, Luk Keng Wong Uk is part of the Sha Ta constituency, which is currently represented by Ko Wai-kei.

Further reading

References

External links

 Delineation of area of existing village Luk Keng Wong Uk (Sha Tau Kok) for election of resident representative (2019 to 2022)
 Antiquities and Monuments Office. Hong Kong Traditional Chinese Architectural Information System Chan Nam Tak Ancestral Hall

Villages in North District, Hong Kong